Sant'Eufemia (the Italian for Saint Euphemia) may refer to:

Places in Italy
 Sant'Eufemia d'Aspromonte in the province of Reggio Calabria
 Sant'Eufemia della Fonte, a frazione of Brescia
 Sant’Eufemia Buffalora (Brescia Metro), the metro station for Sant'Eufemia della Fonte
 Sant'Eufemia a Maiella in the province of Pescara
 Sant'Eufemia Lamezia, a district of Lamezia Terme in the province of Catanzaro

Churches in Italy
 Basilica of Sant'Eufemia, Grado
 Sant'Eufemia, Piacenza
 Sant'Eufemia, Venice
 Sant'Eufemia, Verona

See also
 Eufemia (disambiguation)
 Basilica of Sant'Eufemia (disambiguation)
 Santa Eufemia (disambiguation)